Earl of Longford is a title that has been created twice in the Peerage of Ireland.

History
The title was first bestowed upon Francis Aungier, 3rd Baron Aungier of Longford, in 1677, with remainder to his younger brother Ambrose. He had previously represented Surrey in the House of Commons and had already been created Viscount Longford in the Peerage of Ireland in 1675, with similar remainder. He was succeeded according to the special remainder (and, normally, in the barony) by his brother Ambrose, the second Earl. On his death in 1706 all the titles became extinct. The title of Baron Aungier of Longford was created in the Peerage of Ireland in 1621 for the first Earl's grandfather Sir Francis Aungier, Master of the Rolls in Ireland. The latter was succeeded by his eldest son Gerald, the second Baron, who in his turn was succeeded by his nephew, the aforementioned third Baron and first Earl of Longford, the eldest son of Ambrose Aungier, Chancellor of St Patrick's Cathedral, second son of the first Baron. Gerald Aungier, brother of the first Earl, was Governor of Bombay.

Alice Aungier, sister of the first and second Earl of Longford, married Sir James Cuffe, Member of Parliament for County Mayo. Their son Francis Cuffe also represented County Mayo in the Irish Parliament. Francis's son Michael Cuffe sat as Member of Parliament for County Mayo and Longford Borough. Michael's daughter Elizabeth Cuffe married Thomas Pakenham, of Pakenham Hall, just outside Castlepollard, County Westmeath, in 1739. Thomas represented Longford Borough in the Irish House of Commons. In 1756 the Longford title held by his wife's ancestors was revived when he was raised to the Peerage of Ireland as Baron Longford, in the County of Longford. In 1785 the earldom was also revived when Elizabeth was created Countess of Longford in her own right in the Peerage of Ireland. Lord Longford was succeeded by his eldest son, the second Baron. He represented Longford County in the Irish Parliament. He died aged only 49 and was succeeded by his son, the third Baron. In 1794 the third baron also succeeded his grandmother as second Earl of Longford. Lord Longford sat in the British House of Lords as one of the 28 original Irish Representative Peers. In 1821 he was created Baron Silchester, of Silchester in the County of Southampton, in the Peerage of the United Kingdom, which gave him and his descendants an automatic seat in the House of Lords.

He was succeeded by his eldest son, the third Earl. He died unmarried and was succeeded by his younger brother, the fourth Earl. He was a Conservative politician and served under the Earl of Derby and Benjamin Disraeli as Under-Secretary of State for War from 1866 to 1868. His son, the fifth Earl, was Lord-Lieutenant of County Longford from 1887 to 1915. Lord Longford was killed in action at Gallipoli in 1915. He was succeeded by his eldest son, the sixth Earl. He was a minor playwright and poet and also sat as a member of Seanad Éireann between 1946 and 1948.

He died childless and was succeeded by his younger brother, the seventh Earl. He was a prominent Labour politician and social activist. In 1945, sixteen years before he succeeded his elder brother, he was raised to the Peerage of the United Kingdom in his own right as Baron Pakenham, of Cowley in the City of Oxford. Lord Longford served in the Labour administrations of Clement Attlee and Harold Wilson as Chancellor of the Duchy of Lancaster, First Lord of the Admiralty, Lord Privy Seal, Leader of the House of Lords and Secretary of State for the Colonies. In 1999, at the age of 94 and after the House of Lords Act 1999 removed the automatic right of hereditary peers to sit in the House of Lords, Lord Longford was created a life peer as Baron Pakenham of Cowley, of Cowley in the County of Oxfordshire. He was therefore able to remain a member of the House of Lords until his death in 2001.

 the titles (other than that of Baron Pakenham of Cowley, which as a life peerage became extinct in 2001) are held by his eldest son, the eighth Earl. He does not use his title and did not use his courtesy title of Lord Silchester which he was entitled to from 1961 to 2001. Known simply as Thomas Pakenham, he is a writer and historian.

Several other members of the Pakenham family have also gained distinction. Henry Pakenham, great-grandfather of the first Baron, represented Navan in the Irish House of Commons. His son Sir Thomas Pakenham, grandfather of the first Baron, sat as Member of Parliament for Augher. Sir Thomas's son Edward Pakenham, father of the first Baron, represented County Westmeath in the Irish Parliament. The Honourable Sir Thomas Pakenham, third son of the first Baron and the Countess of Longford, was an admiral in the Royal Navy. His fourth son Sir John Pakenham was also an admiral in the Royal Navy while his fifth son Sir Richard Pakenham was a noted diplomat and served as Envoy Extraordinary and Minister Plenipotentiary to the United States from 1843 to 1847. The Honourable Sir Edward Pakenham, second son of the second Baron, was a major-general in the army.  He served in the Peninsular Wars under his brother-in-law, General Arthur Wellesey, who married his sister Kitty Pakenham in 1806. Sir Edward Pakenham was killed at the Battle of New Orleans in 1815.

The Honourable Sir Hercules Pakenham (1781–1850), third son of the second Baron, was a lieutenant-general in the army and Member of Parliament for Westmeath. He was the father of 1) Edward Pakenham, Member of Parliament for Antrim, and 2) Sir Thomas Pakenham, also a lieutenant-general. The latter's eldest son Hercules Pakenham was an Ulster Unionist Party member of the Senate of Northern Ireland. The Honourable Thomas Alexander Pakenham (1820–1889), third son of the second Earl, was a rear-admiral in the Royal Navy. His second son Sir William Pakenham was an admiral in the Royal Navy. The Honourable Sir Francis Pakenham, seventh son of the second Earl, was a diplomat and notably served as Ambassador to Sweden. Lady Violet Pakenham, daughter of the fifth Earl, was a writer and critic and the wife of the author Anthony Powell. Elizabeth Pakenham (born Harman), Countess of Longford, wife of the seventh Earl, was a writer and social activist. Lady Antonia Fraser and Rachel Billington, daughters of the seventh Earl, are both prominent authors. Lady Judith Kazantzis, daughter of the seventh Earl, is a poet. The Honourable Sir Michael Pakenham, third son of the seventh Earl, is a diplomat.

The ancestral seat of the Pakenham family is Tullynally Castle, County Westmeath. Previously known as Pakenham Hall, it was renamed by the current owner, Thomas Pakenham and North Aston Hall near North Aston, Oxfordshire

Not to be confused with Baron Longford, a minor British Peerage title (1747) of the current Earl of Radnor.

Baron Aungier of Longford (1621)
Francis Aungier, 1st Baron Aungier of Longford ( – 1632) 
Gerald Aungier, 2nd Baron Aungier of Longford (died 1655)
Francis Aungier, 3rd Baron Aungier of Longford (died 1700) (created Viscount Longford in 1675)

Viscount Longford, first creation (1675)
Francis Aungier, 1st Viscount Longford (died 1700) (created Earl of Longford in 1677)

Earl of Longford, first creation (1677)
Francis Aungier, 1st Earl of Longford (died 1700)
Ambrose Aungier, 2nd Earl of Longford (died 1706)

Viscount Longford, second creation (1713)
Christopher Fleming, 1st Viscount Longford and 17th Baron Slane (1669-1726)

Lord Slane (who had succeeded to the title Baron Slane in 1676) was created Viscount Longford by Queen Anne in 1713. The viscounty became extinct upon his death.

Baron Longford (1756)
Thomas Pakenham, 1st Baron Longford (1713–1766)
Edward Michael Pakenham, 2nd Baron Longford (1743–1792)
Thomas Pakenham, 3rd Baron Longford (1774–1835) (succeeded his grandmother as Earl of Longford in 1794)

Earl of Longford, second creation (1785)
Elizabeth Pakenham, 1st Countess of Longford (1719–1794). Lady Longford was the daughter of Michael Cuffe, Member of Parliament for County Mayo and Longford Borough, by Frances Sandford, daughter of Henry Sandford, of Castlerea, County Mayo. She was the great-granddaughter of Sir James Cuffe by his wife Alice Aungier, sister and heiress of Francis Aungier, 1st Earl of Longford, and Ambrose Aungier, 2nd Earl of Longford, of the first creation. Lady Longford married Thomas Pakenham, son of Edward Pakenham, in 1740. In 1756 the Longford title held by her ancestors was revived when her husband was created Baron Longford in the Peerage of Ireland. In 1785 the earldom was also revived when Lady Longford was created Countess of Longford in the Irish peerage in her own right. Lord Longford died in April 1766, aged 52. Lady Longford survived him by almost thirty years and died in January 1794, aged 74. She was succeeded in the earldom by her grandson, Thomas, her eldest son Edward having predeceased her. 
Edward Michael Pakenham, 2nd Baron Longford (1743–1792)
Thomas Pakenham, 2nd Earl of Longford (1774–1835)
Edward Michael Pakenham, 3rd Earl of Longford (1817–1860)
William Lygon Pakenham, 4th Earl of Longford (1819–1887)
William Pakenham, Lord Silchester (1864–1876)
Thomas Pakenham, 5th Earl of Longford (1864–1915)
Edward Arthur Henry Pakenham, 6th Earl of Longford (1902–1961)
Francis Aungier "Frank" Pakenham, 7th Earl of Longford (1905–2001)
Thomas Francis Dermot Pakenham, 8th Earl of Longford (born 1933)
 
The heir apparent is the present holder's eldest son Edward Melchior Pakenham, Lord Silchester (b. 1970)
The heir apparent’s heir apparent is his eldest son, Hon. Thomas Arthur Pakenham (b. 2012)

Line of succession and other titles held by descendants of the 1st Countess

  Elizabeth Pakenham, 1st Countess of Longford (1719–1794)
  Edward Michael Pakenham, 2nd Baron Longford (1743–1792)
   Thomas Pakenham, 2nd Earl of Longford, 1st Baron Silchester (1774–1835)
   William Lygon Pakenham, 4th Earl of Longford, 3rd Baron Silchester (1819–1887)
   Thomas Pakenham, 5th Earl of Longford, 4th Baron Silchester (1864–1915)
   Francis Aungier "Frank" Pakenham, 7th Earl of Longford, 6th Baron Silchester, 1st Baron Pakenham (1905–2001)
   Thomas Pakenham, 8th Earl of Longford, 7th Baron Silchester, 2nd Baron Pakenham (born 1933)
 (1) Edward Pakenham (born 1970)
 (2) Frederick Pakenham (born 1971)
 Hon. Patrick Pakenham (1937–2005)
 (3) Richard Pakenham (born 1969)
 (4) Alexander Pakenham (born 2004)
 (5) Guy Pakenham (born 1970)
 (6) Harry Pakenham (born 1972)
 (7) Hon. Sir Michael Pakenham (born 1943)
  Hon. Kevin Pakenham (1947–2020)
 (8) Thomas Pakenham (born 1977)
 (9) Benjamin Pakenham (born 1983)
 (10) Dominic Pakenham (born 1989)
 Hon. Sir Hercules Robert Pakenham (1781–1850)
 Thomas Pakenham (1826–1913)
 Hercules Pakenham (1863–1937)
 Hercules Pakenham (1901–1940)
male issue in line to Irish peerages
 Hon. Henry Pakenham (1787–1863)
 William Pakenham (1826–1886)
 Robert Pakenham (1866–1959)
 Robert Pakenham (1912–1998)
male issue in line to Irish peerages
 Hamilton Pakenham (1867–1957)
 Richard Pakenham (1906–1993)
male issue in line to Irish peerages
 Henry Pakenham (1911–2010)
male issue in line to Irish peerages
 Hon. Sir Thomas Pakenham (1757–1836)

(1)–(9) are in line for the earldom and both the Silchester and the Pakenham baronies.
(10)–(19) are in line for the earldom and the Silchester barony.

Feudal lords and feudal barons of Annaly, Westmeath and later County Longford
In 1552, King Edward VI granted lands of Annalye to Baron Delvin including the Holy Island and lands of the O'Ferralls.

In 1556-57, Philip and Mary made grants to Lord Baron Delvin of the northern Annaly region before the county became County Longford.

King James I also granted to Lord Baron Delvin the Island and monastery of Inchemore, otherwise Inismore, in the Annalie.

Longford's Market and Fair Rights - Baron Delvin was Granted Patent and Charter for Market and Fair - Grant 1605 -  License to hold a Thursday market and a fair on the 1st of August with the usual court baron powers

Notes

References

Kidd, Charles, Williamson, David (editors). Debrett's Peerage and Baronetage (1990 edition). New York: St Martin's Press, 1990.

Earldoms in the Peerage of Ireland
Extinct earldoms in the Peerage of Ireland
Earl
1677 establishments in the British Empire
 
Peerages created with special remainders
Noble titles created in 1677
Noble titles created in 1785
People educated at Belvedere College